The 1926 Oglethorpe Stormy Petrels football team represented  Oglethorpe University as a member of the Southern Intercollegiate Athletic Association (SIAA) during the 1926 college football season. The highlight of the season was the 7 to 6 victory over Georgia Tech.

Schedule

References

External links 

 

Oglethorpe
Oglethorpe Stormy Petrels football seasons
Oglethorpe Stormy Petrels football